Joan Schulze (born October 13, 1936) is an American artist, lecturer, and poet. Schulze's career spans over five decades: she is best known for her work of contemporary quilts, fiberarts, and collage. Schulze has been named a “pioneer of the art quilt movement,” and her influence has been compared to that of Robert Rauschenberg’s. Her work is in galleries and private collections worldwide including the Renwick Gallery/Smithsonian Institution in Washington DC, the Museum of Arts and Design in New York, & the Oakland Museum of California.

Early life and education 
Schulze, daughter of Joseph and Ann Smith, was born in Chicago, Illinois. Schulze is the oldest daughter and second of six children. During her high school years, Schulze was introduced to sewing in a home economics class that taught her how to fashion her own articles of clothing. After her graduation from Chicago's Lindblom Technical High School in January 1954, Schulze went on to earn her bachelor's degree in Education from the University of Illinois at Urbana-Champaign, graduating in January 1958. Art classes in high school and college revealed Schulze's natural gifts as an artist, yet Schulze put aside her desires to choose this path, favoring the practicality and secure nature of a career as an educator.

Immediately upon her graduation from college, Schulze began to work as an elementary school teacher. In 1959, she married husband James Schulze, and their four children were born between the years of 1962 and 1969.

Career

Early years 
Schulze relocated to California from Texas in 1966, a move that brought Schulze's artistic passions into focus and informally marked her transition from schoolteacher to professional artist. Her new environment nourished her artistic inclinations: she was inspired by the rich and picturesque terrain that California offered, sceneries that contrasted greatly with Chicago's cityscapes. Additionally, Schulze was stimulated by the significant number of artists in her community, motivating her to follow in their footsteps. She began honing her sewing and embroidery skills through workshops in the Peninsula Stitchery Guild, as well as the Bay Area Arts and Crafts Guild, of which she became president in the mid-1970's. After realizing it would not be sustainable to return to her career as an elementary school teacher, Schulze made the decision to officially pursue art full-time in 1970. This commitment would include showing her work in exhibitions & galleries, selling work, and teaching.
Schulze made her first quilt in 1974 after she was approached to teach an adult education class on quilt-making. While she was already well acquainted with needle & thread, this first attempt at quilting came as an exercise of preparation and qualification to teach the class. Schulze, a self-proclaimed “autodidact,” received no formal training and little art instruction before and during her career as an artist, choosing instead to rely on instinct and experimentation. Apart from two art courses in high school and college, Schulze attributes three formative learning experiences with providing her the necessary tools and inspiration to bring her visions to life: single-day workshops with the Peninsula Stitchery Guild, a year-long photography course at DeAnza College, and a week-long quilt workshop with Constance Howard (artist) in San Francisco in 1974. After meeting Howard in 1974, the two became close associates, their relationship evolving into one of mentorship and friendship that lasted until Howard's death in 2000. Howard inspired Schulze to take her career to the next level, giving her the advice, encouragement (“‘Do more, Joan. Do more!’”), and guidance that bolstered her professional career.

Artistic development and mature work 
Throughout her career, Schulze has experimented with collage, fiber art techniques, quilt making, and alternative printmaking among other mediums. Schulze is guided by the principle that subject matter and materials carry equal weight in indicating her message: “The themes are what drive the choices I make in construction and materials. Experiments keep my work fresh and interesting to me.”

While she is best known for her contemporary quilt art, Schulze demonstrates an affinity for the collage technique throughout her body of work. Peter Frank (art critic) attributes this consistency to Schulze's dedication to “the ‘collage aesthetic’ that mirrors the disjunctive quality of modern life and seeks to determine coherence and harmony within such disjunction.” Schulze’s relationship with collage predates her career, beginning in her childhood when Schulze would clip images from the Sears Roebuck catalog, adding these & other clippings to her “grab bag,” from which she could pull scraps to collage with. Since then, Schulze has continued to amass a vibrant supply of ephemera, always with the intention to implement these fragments in her work. Schulze prefers to create with what she has & what speaks to her in the moment, a habit of improvisation that writer Sarah E. Tucker likens to that of a jazz musician. Schulze, who finds inspiration in music (specifically jazz and blues genres), has earned the nickname “the Artist Who Dances.”

As her career has evolved, Joan has introduced a variety of techniques into her art. The most prominent methods which Schulze has utilized in the creation of her art include dyeing fabric (1967-1987), photography and photocopy processes (since 1970); “painting, Xerox transfer, direct and glue transfer processes” (beginning in 1980) and digital technology (1990 to present). Despite being an artist of many disciplines, photography is one of the most central elements in her work. For Schulze, her photographs can serve as means of inspiration, but more importantly these images are oftentimes transferred onto fabric or paper, becoming the work of art itself.

While film, point and shoot, and phone cameras have all served Schulze, Schulze cites the photocopier as her “favorite and most important camera.” Starting in the mid 90's, Schulze began to create line drawings in a new way, making photocopies of stitched organza and printing these manipulated images onto silk, leaving the artist with what she refers to as “toner drawings.” In her quilting process, Schulze layers the silk overtop batting and backing, and finishes by adding stitched lines that give depth to her pieces.

Themes and inspiration 

Schulze refers to her Haiku Series (1999—2001) as a group of “visual poems,” with compositions using both fabric and paper. After years of producing quilts of large proportion, this series of small-scale works reoriented her creative focus, reminding her of “the power of limited means and focused attention.”

Schulze's work is oftentimes informed by her global perspective, which has been shaped by her extensive travels as part of her career. Schulze's Bowl Series (2016–2017), can be offered as an example of how her work illustrates the impressions that places leave on her rather than depicting the place itself. After exhibiting and teaching at Shenzhen University in China in 2016, Schulze was gifted a tea bowl from the Tang dynasty as an expression of gratitude from the museum's director, Wu Fan. Schulze created this series to pay homage to this object and the culture it comes from.

One of Schulze's most recent series, Brain Tangles, is a reflection on the loss of her late husband. As her husband's health made its progressive decline, Schulze found herself photographing a small jardiniere of bulbs that would never come to flower. After her husband's death, Schulze drew the parallel between the diminishing life of her husband and the concurrent decay of the bulbs that did not bloom.

Teaching and lectures 

An integral component of Schulze's career as an artist has been to share “the skill she has developed in the pioneering spirit of quiltmaking.” To impart her knowledge, Schulze has been a conference and symposium keynote speaker at international institutions, and has played the role of visiting artist, artist-in-residence, cultural specialist, & juror.

Schulze began to teach and lecture as an artist starting in 1970, yet stepped away from teaching in 2013 after over 40 years. Schulze has taught classes and workshops in the United States, Canada, China, Japan, Australia, Germany, and the United Kingdom. Schulze started her practice of teaching with workshops, originally occurring as local affairs. As her career and technique evolved, so did the material she taught her students. In her workshops, Schulze has covered a number of topics, including collage, fiber art technique, quiltmaking, alternative printing, fan design & construction, and book assembly.

Selected awards and recognition 
In 2017, Schulze was named the recipient of the Fresno Art Museum Council of 100 “Distinguished Woman Artist Award” of 2017. Schulze was the first quilt artist to be named.

Schulze has received recognition from the California State Fair Fine Art Exhibitions (Silver Award); the Rochester Institute of Technology, “The Art Quilt” (Best of Show Award); Quilt National ‘95 (Innovation Award); the Bay Area Art Conservation Guild Annual (Gold Award); the Tokyo International Forum, World Quilt '98 (Gold Award); the Skylark Fine Art Gallery, 2009 (Publishing and Exhibition Prize). Schulze has also been honored with Purchase Awards from the San Jose Museum of Quilts & Textiles and the City of Palo Alto, California.

Selected works

Selected quilts (1979—2018) 

 California II, 1979, 96 x 96”
 No Sky in Manhattan, 1986, 90 x 79”
 Tea Time at the Cloud Hotel, 1991, 78 x 73”
 An American in Rotterdam, 1992, 70 x 52”
 Finding the Golden Edges, 1994, 56 x 57.5”
 Objects of Desire I, 1997, 44 x 38”
 Red Letter Day (Scroll), 1998, 15.5 x 61”
 Gateway Scrolls (Scroll), 1999, 72 x 24”, 96 x 24”, 120 x 24”
 Fast... Faster..., 2001, 48 x 81”
 Angel Drawings, 2003, 48 x 44”
 Frameworks B, 2004, 14.5 x 18”
 Tranquility, 2005, 15 x 17”
 Water Lilies, 2006, 48 x 71”
 Butterfly Logic, 2006, 46 x 44”
 Promises, 2007, 44.25 x 54.5”
 Women in Black, 2008, 29 x 50”
 Visitors, 2009, 44 x 84”
 What We Miss, 2010, 34.5 x 44.5”
 Baring One’s Soul, 2013, 34.5 x 43.5”
 Seven Bowls, 2015, 15 x 17”
 Privileged Spaces, 2016, 42 x 52”
 Opus (Center), 2016, 94 x 134”
 The Unknowable Future, 2017, 48 x 64.5”
 Eye, 2018, 16.5 x 21”

Exhibitions

Selected solo and featured exhibitions 
 Tsinghua University Art Museum, Beijing, China, 2018
 Celebrating 80, Fresno Art Museum, Fresno, California, 2017 - 2018
 Joan Schulze: Poetic License, Shenzhen University Art Gallery & Museum, Shenzhen, China, 2016
 Disappearing Conversations, Goodman 2 Art Building, San Francisco, California, 2015
 San Jose Museum of Quilts & Textiles, Retrospective, San Jose, California, 2010
 iQuilt—iDraw, the original fiction of Joan Schulze, Ararat Regional Art Museum, Melbourne, Australia, 2007
 National Exhibition Centre, Festival of Quilts, Birmingham, England, 2005
 Cornell College, Mt. Vernon, Iowa, 2003
 Washington State University Art Museum, Pullman, Washington, 2001
 Joan Schulze: The New Haiku, One Hundred Collages, Andrea Schwartz Gallery, San Francisco, California, 2000
 Textilforum (The Danish Textile Museum), Herning, Denmark, 1999-2000
 Galerie Smend, Cologne, Germany, 1999
 Gayle Willson Gallery, Southampton, New York, 1981, 1983, 1987, 1999
 Smith Andersen Gallery, Palo Alto, California, 1993

Selected group exhibitions
 Quilt National, Dairy Barn Arts Center, Athens, Ohio, 2021, 2019, 2017, 2013, 2009, 2003
 International Fiber Art Biennale (Catalog & Juror), Tsinghua University Art Museum; Shenzhen Art Museum; Nantong, Jiangsu Province; Henan Art Museum, Suzhou University Art Museum, Shanghai Exhibition Hall, PR China, 2020, 2018, 2016, 2014, 2012, 2012, 2008, 2006, 2004
 International Fiber Arts (IX; VII), Sebastopol Center for the Arts, California, 2019, 2016
 4th Riga International Textiles & Fibre Triennial: TRADITION & INNOVATION, Museum of Decorative Arts & Design, Riga, Latvia, 2010
 12 Voices, Dennos Museum Center, Michigan, 2009
 Connecting Cultures and Colors, First Kyrgyz-American Quilt Exhibit, United States Embassy (Catalog), Kyrgyz Republic, 2006
 Biennale Internazionale Dell’ARTE Contemporanea, Fortezza da Basso (Catalog), Florence, Italy, 2005
 SAMPLE Exhibition (Catalog; Traveling through 2004 to: Williamson Art Gallery; Dutch Textile Museum; Hall Place, Kent), United Kingdom & Netherlands, 2003

Collections

Selected museums 
 Renwick Gallery/Smithsonian Institution, National Museum of American Art, Washington, DC
 Oakland Museum of California, California
 San Jose Museum of Quilts & Textiles, California
 International Quilt Study Center & Museum, Nebraska
 National Quilt Museum, Paducah, Kentucky
 Musée ArtColle, Sergines, France
 Museo de Collage, Morelos, México
 Museum of Arts & Design, New York
 Racine Art Museum, Wisconsin
 Puke Ariki Museum, New Plymouth, New Zealand

Selected corporate 
 Stanford University, Palo Alto, California
 Luther College (Iowa), Decorah
 VISA International, San Francisco, California
 Adobe Systems, Inc., San Jose, California
 Queen of Apostles Catholic Church, San Jose, California
 U. S. Embassy, Addis Ababa, Ethiopia
 Isle of Daiichi Chapel, Japan
 Kaiser Permanente, San Jose, Santa Clara, CA; Denver, CO
 Palo Alto Medical Foundation, Burlingame, Fremont, & Mountain View, CA
 John M. Walsh III Collection of Contemporary Art Quilts, New York

Publications 
 Schulze, Joan. Celebrating 80. Schulze Press, 2017. 
 Schulze, Joan. In-Between: Poems. Schulze Press, 2018. 
 Schulze, Joan, and Janet De Boer. iQULIT - iDRAW: The Original Fiction of Joan Schulze (Catalogue). Ararat Regional Art Gallery, 2007.
 Schulze, Joan. Leftover Traces of Yesterday. Postcard Press, 1990.
 Schulze, Joan. Poetic License: The Art of Joan Schulze. Chinese translation by Teresa Huang, Schulze Press, 2010.  (paperback edition);  (hardcover edition)
 Schulze, Joan. Quilts. Schulze Press, 2005. 
 Schulze, Joan. The Art of Joan Schulze. Custom & Limited Editions, 1999. 
 Schulze, Joan. Winter of Loss. Schulze Press, 2020.

References

Quilters
20th-century American poets
21st-century American poets
American women poets
Lecturers
21st-century American artists
20th-century American artists
20th-century American women artists
21st-century American women artists
American embroiderers
Robert Lindblom Math & Science Academy alumni